Édouard Colbert de Villacerf (born 1628; died in Paris on 17 October 1699) was a senior official in the government of Louis XIV.

Life 
He was the cousin of both Jean-Baptiste Colbert and Michel Le Tellier, son of Jean-Baptiste Colbert de Saint-Pouange and Claude Le Tellier, he entered the offices of the latter and served as the first war clerk. First maitre d'hotel to the queen, he was also court man and familiar with Louis XIV. In 1686, he received the appointment of general inspector of buildings from the king, which made him deputy to Louvois in the superintendence of buildings. On the death of Louvois, Villacerf succeeded him as Superintendent of Buildings on the 28 July 1691, but held this office only by commission and not ex officio. He had married Geneviève Larcher, from whom he had, among others, Charles-Maurice Colbert, known as the Abbé de Villacerf, General Agent of the Clergy of France.

References 

1628 births
1699 deaths
French politicians
16th-century French politicians
Louis XIV